The QGF-03 helmet is a combat helmet deployed by the Chinese People's Liberation Army in 2005. The helmet, like its predecessor the QGF-02, is made from a kevlar composite material and replaces older steel helmets such as the GK80 for frontline troops.

History
The QG0-F03 is being replaced by the Type 15A helmet, based on a tender notice issued by the PLA on August 4, 2017.

Development
The QG-F03 helmet was a development from the first Chinese kevlar helmet, the QGF-02, first produced in 1994 and issued to units such as the PLA Hong Kong Garrison. The QGF-02 was intended to be lighter than the existing steel helmets and ballistically equivalent to the US PASGT helmet.

Users

References

Combat helmets of the People's Republic of China
Military equipment introduced in the 2000s